The Sustainable Commodity Initiative (SCI) is a joint initiative launched by the International Institute for Sustainable Development (IISD) and the United Nations Conference on Trade and Development (UNCTAD) in 2003. The SCI was formed to facilitate the development and implementation of sustainable commodity production and trade on a global scale by working with the international community. The aim of the initiative is to enhance social, environmental, and economic welfare on a global scale. SCI works collaboratively with  the private sector, government institutions and development-focused NGOs. It is also compatible with UNCTAD's Voluntary Sustainability Standards (VSS). SCI is funded by governments worldwide, United Nations agencies, foundations, the private sector, and individual donors.

Activities 
SCI conducts targeted research on market impacts, facilities collaboration and information sharing across existing voluntary sustainability initiatives (VSIs) and facilitates policy and initiative development.

Specific objectives include:
 Improve stakeholder decision-making capacity through access to information on sustainability.
 Improve return on investment for VSIs.
 Improve the poverty reduction abilities of VSIs through rural stakeholders.
 Reduce the environmental impacts of voluntary initiatives.

Through consultation, SCI identified five cross-cutting areas for the development of sustainable practices across global supply chains, including 
Supporting access to market information on sustainable products
Strengthening technical assistance for sustainable production
Improving access to finance for sustainable production
Strengthening the evidence base on impacts of sustainable products and supply chains
Facilitating the development of supportive policy for sustainable products and markets

Definition of voluntary sustainability initiatives 
SCI's "Voluntary Sustainability Initiatives" (VSIs) are non-mandatory and based on partnerships or collaboration among multiple supply chain stakeholders. Over the last decade, more than 20 new global VSIs have been established with the aim of leveraging market forces to promote sustainable development.

Examples of operational VSIs include Fairtrade, International Federation of Organic Agriculture Movements (IFOAM), Forest Stewardship Council, Marine Stewardship Council, The Roundtable on Sustainable Palm Oil, Global Compact, ISO 14000, Global Reporting Initiative, and CERES Principles Ceres (organization).

VSIs develop strategies for channeling a growing private sector interest by promoting sustainability toward common approaches and pooled investment. With the potential to create unified approaches and the economies of scale needed to bring about widespread change in the global level, voluntary supply-chain approaches are ready to establish a new paradigm for commodity production and trade.

"Cross-cutting" initiatives seek to promote inter-initiative cooperation to improve efficiency, transparency and effectiveness within the sector. The growth in the number of NGO, government and industry-led initiatives has increased the opportunities to promote sustainable practice in commodity sectors but has also led to a growth of transaction and implementation costs that threaten the viability of these approaches. Most initiatives have the potential to benefit considerably from shared learning and collaboration with service providers since they have similar objectives and implement similar activities on the ground.

Since the majority of voluntary initiatives focus on the practices of individual supply chain actors, a largely untapped global "macro" oriented approach to production poses new opportunities for the development of sustainable commodity supply chains. 

In addition to carrying out its own inter-initiatives' collaboration, the SCI is either a participant or member of the following initiatives:
 Sustainable Agriculture Initiative Platform
 Sustainable Food Lab
 International Social and Environmental Accreditation and Labelling (ISEAL) Alliance
 The World Bank's Trade Standards Practitioners Network

The Trade Standards Practitioners Network provides detailed descriptions of major VSIs across commodity sectors worldwide.

SCI Projects

Impact Assessment - COSA 
The Committee on Sustainability Assessment (COSA) project is a research consortium assessing the costs and benefits of sustainability standards.

Recent growth in sustainable markets has created new opportunities for producers in developing countries to sell higher  specialty products and create more stable trading relationships. The adoption of sustainable production methods and the entry into sustainable markets, however, is becoming increasingly more complicated for producers and other supply chain actors to navigate, especially as the number of sustainability programs/processes and certification bodies grow.

With a diverse range of sustainability programs to choose from, producers, consumers, policymakers and companies lack independent, credible data on what it really means to become compliant with social, economic and environmental sustainability initiatives. To date, there is very little detailed information on the impacts of sustainability standards. 

The Sustainable Commodity Initiative's Committee on Sustainability Assessment (COSA) project was founded to strengthen the evidence base on the impacts of sustainable products and supply chains. COSA has developed a scientific methodology using multi-criteria analysis for gathering and understanding concrete, fact-based data on the outcomes associated with sustainability programs.

The COSA executive committee includes the International Institute for Sustainable Development (IISD), Nicaragua's Centro Agronómico Tropical de Investigación y Enseñanza (CATIE), Costa Rica's [Centro de Inteligencia sobre Mercados Sostenibles] (CIMS/INCAE), France's Centre de coopération internationale en recherche agronomique pour le développement (CIRAD) and Switzerland's State Secretariat for Economic Affairs (SECO). This committee, with the endorsement of the International Coffee Organization and initial seed support from USAID, NORAD and BTC, worked with institutions in  producing countries to adapt and develop the COSA methodology.

Finance for Sustainable Trade - FAST 
Created in 2007, the Finance Alliance for Sustainable Trade (FAST) is a member driven, non-profit international organization headquartered in Montreal, Canada. Its current membership base (over 100 members) represents Small and Medium Enterprise producer organizations, commercial and socially-oriented lenders, development focused NGOs, and other sustainable trade stakeholders.

Small and medium-sized enterprise (SME) producers have been identified as one of the most important drivers of economic growth and poverty reduction in developing countries. Sustainable SME producers are growing in number and are key drivers behind a global transition to sustainable trade. Currently, a major barrier facing the continued growth and development of SME's is the unmet need for external finance. Since entry into sustainable markets typically requires additional capital investment - many producers in developing countries simply cannot afford to invest in the transition.

FAST's mission is to facilitate a global collaborative effort among its members to ensure continued growth of the sustainable trade sector. This is made possible by increasing the number of producers in developing countries who can successfully access affordable trade finance and longer-term loans, tailored to their business needs as they enter sustainable markets.

The SCI's role in the development of FAST dates back to 2003, when discussions among members of the SCI's Sustainable Coffee Partnership identified improving producer access to finance as a key strategy in achieving its core objectives of enabling the adoption of more sustainable practices across commodity markets. The SCI took the lead in convening FAST stakeholders at the Specialty Coffee Association of America's annual conference in 2005 and 2006 and continued to lead the process, along with steering committee participants, until FAST's formal establishment as a non-profit organization in 2007. Currently, the SCI and FAST work collaboratively on a number of projects.

Technical Assistance - SCAN 
The Sustainable Commodity Assistance Network (SCAN) partnership is a multi-initiative platform led by the Sustainable Commodity Initiative (SCI) and funded by  HIVOS and Solidaridad. The goal of the SCAN partnership is to improve the livelihoods of rural commodity producers, workers and communities in developing countries by empower smallholder producer groups through focused technical assistance to undertake sustainable farm and business management practices and attain efficient entry into sustainable markets. SCAN will link the technical assistance efforts of VSI's through a common platform.

SCAN is working with existing technical assistance providers, VSI's and development focused NGO's to create a more cohesive global technical assistance platform that will address the following observations:

Market Growth: As markets for sustainable products continue to grow producers gain a unique opportunity to utilize a ‘specialty market' structure to sell higher priced products while also incorporating a high level of social and environmental integrity. Market growth for sustainable products has created an increased opportunity for producers to participate in specialty markets that ensure sustainable development impacts. This has created an increased need for larger-scale technical assistance delivery across a growing number of commodities and regions.
 Overlap in Training Practices: There is a growing area of overlap between the objectives and implementation frameworks of different standards. Most initiatives now promote a similar set of social, health, economic and environmental standards and realize that insufficient attention has been given to product quality and the overall market implications. With the high transaction costs associated with the delivery of training and the depth of the technical assistance needed throughout commodity producing countries, there lies a clear opportunity to improve efficiency and scale. By reducing overlap and creating a collaborative network, initiatives will be better able to identify and implement best practice and create substantial administrative and cost savings.
 Gaps in Business Training: Most technical assistance programs currently in place are topic specific and are often linked to a specific sustainability initiative. Similarly, existing training activities that these initiatives conduct often focus only on achieving compliance due to insufficient resources to go further. As a result, today very limited resources exist to train producers on how to manage a sustainable business and actively participate in international sustainable and specialty markets. By improving training to include modules on access to sustainable markets, marketing and risk management, producers will better able to take a more proactive role in planning and sales.
 Quality Management Systems: There is a lack of coherence in quality management systems (QMS) procedures amongst most standards-based initiatives. Most initiatives allow group certification for organized smallholders on the condition that they apply some form of Internal Control System (ICS). At present, the ICS's required by the different standards bodies are neither standardized nor consistent and, more importantly, do not always promote a sound "business management" approach. One producer group should have only one ICS (or QMS) even if the group wishes to comply with more than one global standard. By ensuring that the technical assistance package delivered through SCAN includes comprehensive training on best practices in QMS, producers will improve their ability to successfully comply and gain improved market access.
 Enhanced Producer Organization: Producer organization is often a prerequisite to enabling access to sustainable markets for smallholder producers. Compliance-based technical assistance strategies typically do not currently have the resources or tools to build the requisite organizational structures for producers. Also important is developing improved producer access and interaction with international markets, an approach which requires effective producer organization. Standards bodies agree that producer organization play a central role in enabling disadvantaged producers to benefits from sustainable markets. Specifically, SCAN technical assistance will have a particular focus on facilitating the organization of unorganized producers and improve the organizational capacity of existing organizations.
 Lack of Resources: Comparatively little attention has been given by initiatives to support large-scale transition to sustainable production and management due to limited resources available to any one initiative. By pooling efforts and resources and expertise, SCAN is at the forefront of developing a program that supports the "mainstreaming" of sustainable commodity production and trade.

Reporting - State of Sustainability Initiatives (SSI) 
The State of Sustainability Initiatives (SSI) is a global initiative that will research and report on the impacts of market-based, voluntary approaches to sustainable commodity production and trade.  The SSI is a knowledge-sharing programme that will improve information-sharing and transparency in voluntary supply chain initiatives through an independent annual reporting service and learning network. The SSI began in 2008 and is coordinated by the International Institute for Environment and Development (IIED), the International Institute for Sustainable Development (IISD), AidEnvironment and the United Nations Conference on Trade and Development (UNCTAD).

Over the past two decades a growing number of voluntary sustainability initiatives and other multi-stakeholder alliances have emerged to improve the livelihoods of the millions of commodity-dependent producers and manufacturers around the world.  The growth of such initiatives represents an important opportunity for all stakeholders to participate in the greening of global supply chains and improvement of producer livelihoods.  The multiplication of these initiatives makes it increasingly challenging for all stakeholders to stay abreast of the latest developments and best practices across the voluntary sector.  Moreover, it is exceedingly difficult to assess their utility and performance, let alone the steps required to mainstream best practice.  The reporting activities the SSI will enable stakeholders to interact with each other, helping them to benchmark performance and become more effective.

The State of Sustainability Initiatives Annual Review will begin in 2009 and will provide a regular overview of the voluntary initiatives sector, including statistics, market trends, performance metrics in development and use, forward looking strategies. Each annual issue will focus on the relationship between voluntary sustainability initiatives and a key sustainable development theme. The SSI will also produce journalistic updates on developments in sustainable commodity markets and voluntary initiatives around the world, and thematic reports and briefings.

Research 
SCI Research projects in 2008 included:
 Committee on Sustainability Assessment COSA): A scientific methodology using multi-criteria analysis for gathering and understanding concrete, fact based data on the outcomes associated with sustainability programs.
 China Council: A research program funded by SECO and implemented with the Chinese Ministry of Trade. The project provides policy recommendations based on the environmental impacts of forest, cotton and electronics supply chains linked to Chinese import and export.
 Sustainable Commodity Evidence Base: A DEFRA funded research program, the Sustainable Commodity Evidence Base project is implemented in collaboration with Scott Wilson, WWF and GFN. The project is aimed at providing policy recommendations based on the environmental impacts of fish meal, palm oil, soy, sugar, shrimp, forest supply chains linked to UK consumption.
 Sustainable Coffee Partnership: A multi-stakeholder platform, the Sustainable Coffee Partnership is developing and implementing a global strategy for sustainability within the coffee sector.
 ENTWINED Consortium: A research program funded by the MISTRA Foundation, the ENTWINED Consortium is aimed at improving understanding on the economic implications and opportunities of applying trade-based policy as an instrument for improved global environmental governance.

Publications 
The SCI frequently publishes research reports, working papers and policy briefings and recommendations. The majority of the SCI's publications are available to download as pdfs from the SCI website and hard copies of many can be ordered.

External links 
 SCI website 
 Finance Alliance for Sustainable Trade 
 International Institute for Sustainable Development

References 

International sustainability organizations
Sustainable agriculture
Sustainable Commodity Initiative